Bleaklow is a high, largely peat-covered, gritstone moorland in the Derbyshire High Peak near the town of Glossop. It is north of Kinder Scout, across the Snake Pass (A57), and south of the A628 Woodhead Pass.

Bleaklow Head (633 m), marked by a huge cairn of stones, the high point at the western side of the moor, is a Hewitt and is crossed by the Pennine Way. At , Bleaklow is the second-highest point in Derbyshire and the area includes the most easterly point in the British Isles over 2,000 feet, near Bleaklow Stones.

Description 
Much of the main plateau of Bleaklow is a boggy peat moorland, seamed by 'groughs' (pronounced 'gruffs', water-eroded channels in the peat) and lacking strong changes in elevation – in poor conditions its traverse is probably the most navigationally challenging in the Peak District.

Conservation 
Bleaklow is part of the National Trust's High Peak Estate. There has been considerable investment of resources in recent years to block many of the eroded peat gulleys as part of major schemes to re-wet and restore healthy Sphagnum moss communities which are essential for peat formation, carbon capture, and reduction in dissolved carbon which contaminates water supplies. Much of this work has been coordinated by the Moors for the Future Partnership, funded by EU LIFE+ programme between 2010 and 2015. This involved laying  of geotextiles to stabilise eroded peat, creating 4,000 mini-dams to retain water, introducing 150,000 moorland plants and spreading 807 million Sphagnum fragments across the whole Bleaklow Project site.

Views 
The summit affords views across Manchester, Lancashire and Cheshire to the west and towards the Hope Valley, Holme Moss, Emley Moor and Yorkshire to the east. In exceptional weather conditions it is possible to see Snowdonia in North Wales.

Aircraft crash 

There are a number of aircraft crash sites on Bleaklow. On 3 November 1948, USAF Boeing RB-29A Superfortress 44–61999, of the 16th Photographic Reconnaissance Squadron, 91st Reconnaissance Group, 311th Air Division, Strategic Air Command, crashed at Higher Shelf Stones, Bleaklow, en route from Scampton to Burtonwood. All 13 crew members were killed. A large amount of wreckage of the Bleaklow Bomber is still visible. A memorial was erected at the site in 1988. There is public access to the area.

Gallery

References

External links

Peak District Information - Bleaklow 
Computer-generated summit panorama Bleaklow index

Hewitts of England
Mountains and hills of the Peak District
Mountains and hills of Derbyshire
Nuttalls
Moorlands of England
High Peak, Derbyshire
Aviation accidents and incidents locations in England